The Namibia Water Corporation or NamWater is a parastatal in Namibia. It is wholly owned by the Ministry of Agriculture of the Government of Namibia. In 2018 they employed 594 people.

References

External links
 Official Web Site

Government-owned companies of Namibia
Companies established in 1997